Fruitdale can refer to several U.S. communities:
Fruitdale, Alabama, in Washington County, Alabama
Fruitdale, California
Fruitdale (VTA), a light rail station in San Jose, California
Fruitdale, Indiana
Fruitdale, Ohio
Fruitdale, South Dakota
Fruitdale, Dallas, Texas
Harbeck-Fruitdale, Oregon